"We Will Rock You" is a song written by Brian May and recorded by British rock band Queen for their 1977 album News of the World. Rolling Stone ranked it number 330 of "The 500 Greatest Songs of All Time" in 2004, and it placed at number 146 on the Songs of the Century list in 2001. In 2009, "We Will Rock You" was inducted into the Grammy Hall of Fame.

Other than the last 30 seconds, which contains a guitar solo by May, the song is generally set in a cappella form, using only stomping and clapping as a rhythmic body percussion beat. In 1977, "We Will Rock You" and "We Are the Champions" were issued together as a worldwide top 10 single. Soon after the album was released, many radio stations played the songs consecutively, without interruption.

Since its release, "We Will Rock You" has been covered, remixed, sampled, parodied, referred to, and used by multiple recording artists, TV shows, films and other media worldwide. It has also become a popular stadium anthem at sports events around the world, due mostly to its simple rhythm. On 7 October 2017, Queen released a Raw Sessions version of the track to celebrate the 40th anniversary of the release of News of the World. It features a radically different approach to the guitar solo and includes May's count-in immediately prior to the recording.

Music
"We Will Rock You" and "We Are the Champions" were written in response to an event that occurred during the A Day at the Races Tour. The band played at Stafford's Bingley Hall, and, according to Brian May:

One version was used as the opening track on 1977's News of the World. This consists of a stomp-stomp-clap-pause beat, and a power chorus, being somewhat of an anthem. The stamping effects were created by the band overdubbing the sounds of themselves stomping and clapping many times and adding delay effects to make it sound like many people were participating. The durations of the delays were in the ratios of prime numbers, a technique now known as non-harmonic reverberation. A tape loop is used to repeat the last phrase of the guitar solo three times as opposed to Brian May playing it three separate times on the recording. The "stomp, stomp, clap" sounds were later used in the Queen + Paul Rodgers song "Still Burnin'".

When performed live, the song is usually followed by "We Are the Champions", as they were designed to run together. The songs are often paired on the radio and at sporting events, where they are frequently played. They were the last two songs Queen performed at Live Aid in 1985.

Queen also performed an alternative version of "We Will Rock You" known as the "fast version", featuring a faster-feeling tempo and a full band arrangement. The band would frequently use this version to open their live sets in the late 1970s and early 1980s, as heard on the albums Live Killers (1979), Queen on Fire - Live at the Bowl (2004), Queen Rock Montreal (2007), and the expanded edition of News of the World (2011). A studio recording of this version is also known to exist, recorded for John Peel's show on BBC Radio 1 in 1977. It is part of a longer cut that starts with the original version. In 2002, the fast version was officially released on a promo single distributed by the tabloid The Sun. The "fast" BBC studio version can also be found on The Best of King Biscuit Live Volume 4. Between the two versions, there is a brief cut of Roger Taylor quoting Hermann Hesse's novel Siddhartha, used in a BBC Radio documentary. The fast version is also used as the curtain call music for the musical of the same title, after the finale, which is a pairing of the original "We Will Rock You" and "We Are the Champions".

Music video
The music video for "We Will Rock You" was filmed in 1977 at the back garden of Roger Taylor's mansion. It sees the band lip synching the song, hand clapping with gloves and foot stomping on a frozen ground. In an interview with Billboard, Taylor spoke on filming the video:

Personnel 
Information is based on the album's Liner Notes

 Freddie Mercury – lead and backing vocals, hand claps, foot stamping
 Brian May – electric guitar, backing vocals, hand claps, foot stamping
 Roger Taylor – backing vocals, hand claps, foot stamping
 John Deacon – hand claps, foot stamping

Chart performance

Weekly charts

Year-end charts

Certifications

Notable cover versions

Five + Queen version

British boy band Five released a cover of "We Will Rock You" on 17 July 2000. It was the fourth single released from their second studio album, Invincible (1999). The song features two members of Queen: Brian May on guitar and Roger Taylor on drums; however, they do not sing any vocals on the track. Freddie Mercury had died in November 1991, nearly a decade before this version's release, and John Deacon had retired from public life three years before the release of the Five cover.

The song charted at number one on the UK Singles Chart, making it Five's second number-one single, and their ninth consecutive top-ten hit.

Track listings
"Megamix" consists of four songs by Five: "Don't Wanna Let You Go", "If Ya Gettin' Down", "Keep On Movin'", and "We Will Rock You". The European and Australian versions of "Megamix" omit "We Will Rock You".

UK CD1
"We Will Rock You" (radio edit) – 3:08
"Keep On Movin'" (The Five-A-Side Mix) – 3:32
"We Will Rock You" (video—enhanced track)

UK CD2
"We Will Rock You" (radio edit) – 3:08
"Megamix" – 4:19
"Megamix" video (enhanced track)

UK cassette single
"We Will Rock You" (radio edit) – 3:08
"Keep On Movin'" (The Five-A-Side Mix) – 3:32
"Megamix" – 4:19

European CD single
"We Will Rock You" (radio edit) – 3:08
"Megamix" – 4:19

Australian CD single
"We Will Rock You" (radio edit) – 3:08
"Megamix" – 4:19
"Keep On Movin'" (The Five-A-Side Mix) – 3:32
"We Will Rock You" (video—enhanced track)

Charts

Weekly charts

Year-end charts

KCPK version
A remix by KCPK, sung by a chorus of children under the name Forever Young, was released in a series of animated Evian adverts which aired in France, Germany and Belgium. The remix was later released as a single and entered the local charts.

Chart performance

Year-end charts

Other versions
1992: American glam metal band Warrant covered the song for the film Gladiator. The song charted at number 83 on the Billboard Hot 100.
2004: American pop singers Britney Spears, Beyoncé and Pink used this song in an international commercial Pepsi campaign and the song was released on the Pepsi Music 2004: (Dare for More) CD.

Sampling
1992: American rapper Ice Cube sampled the beat in his song "When Will They Shoot?", from his album The Predator.
2002: American rapper Eminem interpolated the "stomp-stomp-clap" beat in his song "'Till I Collapse" from his album The Eminem Show and also used a similar pattern in the songs "Puke" from his album Encore and "Cinderella Man" from his album Recovery.
2003: The J-Kwon song "Tipsy" directly samples the "We Will Rock You" beat, but reworked into a different beat.
2011: American pop singer Katy Perry interpolated the "stomp-stomp-clap" beat in her song "E.T".
2011: Beyoncé interpolated the "stomp-stomp-clap" beat in her song "Dreaming", featured on the Japanese edition of her 4th album 4.
2011: Lady Gaga sampled the "stomp-stomp-clap" in her song "You and I", which also features the band's guitarist Brian May, from Gaga's album Born This Way.
2012: One Direction interpolated the "stomp-stomp-clap" and references "Rock" in their song "Rock Me" featured on their second album Take Me Home.
2012: Kesha interpolated the "stomp-stomp-clap" in her song "Gold Trans Am", featured on the deluxe edition of her second album, Warrior.

Live cover performances
1990s
1992: Guns N' Roses lead singer Axl Rose performed the song with Queen at the Freddie Mercury Tribute Concert.
1992: U2 used the song as a set list opener before they performed on stage during the Zoo TV Tour.
1993: Nirvana performed it in São Paulo, Brazil, changing the lyrics to "we will fuck you".
1996: Alanis Morissette and her band ended the first encore of her "Can't Not" Tour (following the song, "You Learn") with a cover of the song, with Alanis playing the "stomp-stomp-clap" rhythm on drums.

2000s
2003: English singer and songwriter Robbie Williams performed the song live at Knebworth.
2007, 2010: Japanese pop singer Kumi Koda covered this in her a-nation '07 performance, and three years later in a medley at her 10th anniversary concert at the Tokyo Dome.
2008: Canadian singer Celine Dion performed a Queen medley with "We Will Rock You" and "The Show Must Go On" in her Taking Chances World Tour.
2009: American guitarist Joe Perry from Aerosmith and singer Katy Perry covered the song at the MTV's Video Music Awards 2009.

2010s
2011: American rock band My Chemical Romance performed the song with Queen guitarist Brian May at the Reading Festival.
2011: Christina Aguilera, CeeLo Green, Adam Levine and Blake Shelton covered the song on The Voice (U.S.).
2012: English pop singer Jessie J performed the song live with Brian May and Roger Taylor at the closing ceremony of the 2012 Summer Olympics in London on 12 August.
2012: English rapper Dappy covered the song live alongside Brian May for BBC Radio 1 Live Lounge. The song later appeared on UK chart-topping album BBC Radio 1's Live Lounge 2012.

2020s
In a pre-recorded comedy segment at the opening of the Platinum Party at the Palace on 4 June 2022, Queen Elizabeth II and Paddington Bear tapped their tea cups to the beat of "We Will Rock You" before Queen + Adam Lambert performed the song live outside Buckingham Palace.

Remixes
1991: Rick Rubin produced remixes of "We Will Rock You", for an EP released by Hollywood Records. The "Ruined Remix" also contains contributions by Flea and Chad Smith of the Red Hot Chili Peppers.
1991: Emergency Broadcast Network achieved an underground hit with their remix of the song with a speech by U.S. president George H. W. Bush.
2011: Geddy (a.k.a. Armageddon), former member from hip hop group Terror Squad, mashed up "I Want It All" and "We Will Rock You" for the soundtrack to the 2011 film Sucker Punch.
2012 : Helmut VonLichten (formerly of E.S. Posthumus) mixed this song with an orchestral version of "Posthumus Zone" for CBS's Super Bowl 50 coverage. This mashup was later used for the 2015 film Pixels.
2014 : Canadian dubstep producer Excision and downlink remixed this song in the track Rock You.

Parodies and references to the song
1987: Henry Rollins did a parody of "We Will Rock You" titled "I Have Come to Kill You".
1998: Friends "The One Where Ross Moves In" - [S05E07]: Ross moves into Joey and Chandler's apartment. As time goes by, Ross reveals he's quite annoying by imposing a lot of changes to the norm of the apartment. One being the changing of the answering machine message to the tune of "We Will Rock You" by Queen, to which Ross alters the lyrics to "We Will, We Will Call You Back!".
2010: The cast of the Off-Broadway musical Avenue Q performed covers of "We Will Rock You" and "We Are the Champions" in a video spoof of the Muppets' "Bohemian Rhapsody".
2012: In the March 12 edition of WWE Raw, The Rock performed his version during the Rock Concert segment by adding references to Team Bring It and fans chanting "Cena Sucks" in the chorus while taking aim at John Cena before they square off at WrestleMania XXVIII.
2014: Indonesian singer Ahmad Dhani made a political campaign video with a parody of the song to support presidential candidate Prabowo Subianto. Dhani wore Heinrich Himmler's SS Uniform in the video.
2015: In The Big Bang Theory episode "The Bachelor Party Corrosion" Raj, Howard and Leonard sing a modified version of the song called, "We Will Percussive Shock You" and Sheldon burst out singing the first verse of the original song, which he then credited to his eidetic memory, mentioned that in this instance it was a 'curse.'

See also
List of number-one singles of 1978 (France)
List of UK Singles Chart number ones of the 2000s

References

External links
Lyrics at Queen official website (from Queen Rocks)

1977 songs
1977 singles
Queen (band) songs
2000 singles
Bertelsmann Music Group singles
Elektra Records singles
EMI Records singles
Five (band) songs
Grammy Hall of Fame Award recipients
Hollywood Records singles
Number-one singles in France
Songs written by Brian May
RCA Records singles
Sporting songs
Songs about rock music
UK Singles Chart number-one singles